The Main Central Road, better known as MC Road is the arterial State Highway starting from Kesavadasapuram in Trivandrum city and ends at Angamaly, a suburb of Kochi city in Ernakulam District, in the state of Kerala, India. It is designated as State Highway 1 by the Kerala Public Works Department. The highway was built by Raja Kesavadas, Dewan of Travancore. Plan for a new highway called Thiruvananthapuram–Angamaly Greenfield Highway, which runs parallel to the MC Road is proposed and is under early stage of development.

Route description
This road starts from National Highway 66 at Kesavadasapuram in Thiruvananthapuram the capital city of Kerala and joins the NH 544 at Angamaly Ernakulam district. The MC Road passes through Venjaramoodu, Kilimanoor, Nilamel, Ayoor, Kottarakkara, Enathu, Adoor, Pandalam, Chengannur, Tiruvalla, Changanassery, Kottayam, Ettumanoor, Kuravilangad, Monippally, Puthuvely, Koothattukulam,  Muvattupuzha, Pezhakkappilly , Mannoor , Pulluvazhy, Perumbavoor and Kalady. In addition, an MC bypass road linking thaikkad with Vettu road junction near NH66 in Kazhakoottam is also part of the road in Thiruvananthapuram district. A section of this road between Mulakuzha and Kottayam  is now upgraded as a section of NH 183. MC Road is a popular route to access the shrine of Sabarimala. It covers many important towns of Central and South Kerala.

History
The highway was built by Raja Kesavadas, the dewan of the Travancore Kingdom.
The MC road was renovated under the World Bank aided 'Kerala State Transport Project (2006)'. The upgrading was carried out in two phases. 
Under phase 1, two stretches, Thaikkod (near Venjarammoodu) – Chengannur and Muvattupuzha – Angamaly were upgraded and works were completed in 2010. In addition, a new road link to NH 66 has been completed between Thaikkad and Vettu road (near Kazhakootam in Trivandrum). In phase 2, the Chengannur – Ettumanoor  stretch was upgraded. The project also features protection walls and adequate drainage facilities. The construction of seven bridges has also been envisaged as part of the project. This includes the constructions at Neelimangalam, Manipuzha, Pannikuzhy, Arattukadavu, Illimala, Thondara, and Kallissery. In addition, three existing bridges along the route is also widened. The work was launched on 14 September 2014 and completed in 2018.

Main intersections

 Kesavadasapuram in Trivandrum joins with the National Highway 66
 Mannanthala -(Sreekaryam - Peroorkada Road)
 Vattapara - (Pothencode- Nedumangad Road)
 Vembayam - State Highway 47 (Kerala) connecting Attingal and   Nedumangadu
 Thaikkad jn - MC Bypass road
 Venjarammoodu - State Highway 47 (Kerala) connecting Attingal and         Nedumangadu
 Kilimanoor - State Highway 46 (Kerala) connecting Attingal and Kilimanoor
 Nilamel - State Highway 64 Connecting Varkala & Madathara
 Ayoor (Kollam Road & State Highway 48)
 Kottarakara NH 744 (Kollam- Thirumangalam Road crosses)
 Adoor Central Junction (Pathanamthitta road National Highway 183A (India) & State Highway 5 )
 Adoor High School Junction (State Highway 5)
Pandalam Medical Mission Junction (Pandalam- Nooranad- Kayamkulam road via Kudassanad)
 Pandalam (Mavelikkara-Pathanamthitta road)
Pandalam (Kulanada T.B Junction Pandalam - Aranmula road via Kulanada)
 Mulakuzha (Mavelikara- road via Kodukulanji)
 Chengannur (Mavelikara road via Puliyoor, Kerala)
 Thiruvalla (SH-07 towards Pathanamthitta & Kumbazha)
 Thiruvalla (Ambalapuzha, Kayamkulam road)
 Changanassery (Alapuzha road)
 Changanassery (Vakathanam Road & Vazhoor Road)
 Kottayam (NH 220 towards Kumily & Teni)
 Kottayam Baker Jn. (Kumarakom) & Cherthala
 Ettumanur (MG University road)
 Ettumanur (Pala & Poonjar road)
 Ettumanur (Vaikom & Ernakulam road)
 Kuravilangad (Vaikom & Alapuzha road)
 Kuravilangad (Pala road)
 Kuravilangad (Njeezhoor & Peruva & piravom road)
 Monippally (Ernakulam-Palai road, Piravom, Peruva, Vaikom, Ramapuram, Uzhavoor road)
 Koothattukulam (Palai, Piravom & Kalamassery Proposed NH Road)
 Muvattupuzha (Thodupuzha Road, Main Eastern Highway End Reach)
 Muvattupuzha (Kochi-Madurai NH 49 Intersection)
 Perumbavoor (Aluva-Munnar Road & Kolenchery Road)
 Kalady (Malayattoor Road & Aluva Deasm Road)
 Kalady (Mattoor Junction, Nedumbassery Airport, North Paravur Road)
 Angamali (NH 544)

Surveillance
The Motor Vehicles Department, in partnership with the Kerala Road Safety Authority (KRSA) and the police has installed automatic traffic enforcement camera systems in between Venjaramoodu - Chengannur section of MC road for detecting speed violations of vehicles.

See also
 Thiruvananthapuram-Angamaly Greenfield Highway
 Punalur -Muvattupuzha road
 National Highway 183 (India)
 NH 66
 NH 544
 Roads in Kerala
 List of State Highways in Kerala

References

State Highways in Kerala
Transport in Thiruvananthapuram